The ÷ Tour (pronounced "Divide Tour") was the third world concert tour by English singer-songwriter Ed Sheeran, in support of his third studio album, ÷ (2017) (pronounced "divide"). Comprising 260 shows, it officially began on 16 March 2017, in Turin, Italy and ended on 26 August 2019, in Ipswich, England. Ticket sales started on 2 February 2017. The tour set world records for the highest-grossing concert tour and the most tickets sold by a tour.

Development
On the morning of 26 January 2017, the European dates of the tour were announced through Sheeran's social networks. Hours later through the same networks were announced the dates for Latin America. Tickets for the tour sold out quickly, prompting new dates to be added in London, Turin and Santiago. On 13 February 2017 it was announced that he would be part of the line up for a week of gigs at the Royal Albert Hall in aid of the Teenage Cancer Trust taking place on 28 March 2017. On 22 February 2017, Sheeran announced that Anne-Marie and Ryan McMullan would be the opening acts for the European dates. On 8 March 2017, Sheeran announced the North American leg. James Blunt was announced as the opening act, except for Indianapolis and Cleveland, where the opener was Joshua Radin. On 10 May 2017, Sheeran announced the Oceanian leg. The tour was originally slated to have seven shows, but demand was high, the leg became eighteen shows. On 8 June 2017, Sheeran announced the Asian leg of the tour, which was originally planned for October 2017 until November 2017. However, due to bone fractures in his arms from a bike accident, he had to postpone and cancel parts of the Asian leg. Rescheduled shows in Manila, Osaka, and Tokyo occurred in April 2018, but Taipei, Seoul, Hong Kong, and Jakarta were cancelled.

Lauv served as the opening act in Asia in November. On 28 June 2017, Sheeran announced a stadium tour across Europe. After the initial announcement, tickets sold quickly, which prompted new dates in Cork, Dublin, Manchester, Glasgow, Newcastle, London, Cardiff, Amsterdam, Paris, Gothenburg, Munich, Zürich, Vienna, and Warsaw. Anne-Marie returned as the opening act, while Jamie Lawson was added, and Beoga was added for Ireland. On 22 September 2017, Sheeran announced a stadium tour across North America. On 6 February 2018, Sheeran added dates to the leg with new cities that were not in the initial announcement, and second shows in Toronto, Foxborough, and East Rutherford. Snow Patrol was announced as the main opener for the North American stadium leg, along with Anne-Marie and Lauv in selected dates. On 25 June 2018, Sheeran added two dates, performing in South Africa in March 2019.

On 19 September 2018, Sheeran added more 2019 dates to the tour, performing in stadiums across Europe and the UK, starting in May 2019. Due to high demand, numerous additional dates were added to the tour itinerary.

Sheeran later added even more 2019 dates to the Divide tour, performing in Brazil, Uruguay, and Argentina in February 2019. He also announced that he would be returning to Asia in April 2019, performing the long-awaited dates that were scheduled to take place in Fall 2017 but were cancelled and rescheduled due to bone fractures in the arms from a bike accident. The cities that were affected by the cancellation were Taipei, Seoul, Hong Kong and Jakarta. Sheeran will perform three Asia 2019 dates in Singapore, Seoul, and Bangkok. Sheeran later announced a second date in Cape Town, South Africa at Cape Town Stadium, scheduled for 28 March 2019. On 28 November, Sheeran added dates in Tokyo, Osaka, and Jakarta. On 10 January 2019, Sheeran added dates in Taiwan, Hong Kong and Kuala Lumpur.

For the last four shows, Sheeran played at Chantry Park in Ipswich in what was advertised as a homecoming set of gigs. For each of the four nights, a different additional support act performed; three were chosen by BBC Music Introducing in Suffolk and one by Hoax, all of which were local undercover artists. The local acts that performed were Bessie Turner, Caswell, Salvador and Piers James.

Commercial performance
In Ireland, more than 300,000 tickets for seven shows across Cork, Belfast, Galway and Dublin were sold in a single day, making history with Sheeran being the only artist to ever do so in Irish territory. Due to the phenomenal demand, extra dates were added in both Cork and Dublin, with three dates for each city in total. Sellout status occurred once again in Santiago during his first concert on 15 May, prompting to add one more date.

In Oceania, the tour broke the official record for the most tickets sold, at over 1 million (previously held by the Dire Straits Brothers in Arms Tour of 1985, with around 950,000), as well as most stadium shows by a single artist on one tour (18, formerly held by AC/DC at 14). Sheeran also broke records for the biggest stadium tour of Australia and New Zealand, venue record for highest cumulative attendance on one tour and venue record for highest attendance for a single show. More than 710,000 tickets were sold within a single day of general public sale. In Sydney, a total of 243,513 tickets were sold for three shows at the ANZ Stadium, which rolled out over three successive nights from 15 to 17 March 2018. The attendance per show was 79,726, 81,752 and 82,035, respectively. This set a new record for aggregate attendance at a series of stadium concerts in NSW, smashing the old benchmark of 213,045 set by AC/DC during their Black Ice World Tour in 2010.

According to Billboard, Sheeran's tour grossed $551.8 million and sold 6,209,122 tickets across the 201 dates reported from 16 March 2017 to 31 October 2018. The tour was the eighth highest-grossing tour of 2017, accumulating $122 million and selling 1,408,681 tickets. The Divide Tour became 2018's highest-grossing tour with $429 million, setting all-time records for the highest-grossing solo tour and highest year-end gross ever.  It then broke the all-time highest-grossing record of $735m for any tour set by the U2 360° Tour before it finished, despite playing mostly in smaller venues and deliberately keeping the ticket price relatively low with no VIP areas. This is due to the larger number of shows (255) in the tour, and it also became the most attended tour of all time with over 8.5 million having attended in 43 countries with further dates to play.

Set list
This set list is from the concert on 5 August 2017 in Glendale. It is not intended to represent all shows from the tour.

 "Castle on the Hill"
 "Eraser"
 "The A Team"
 "Don't" / "New Man"
 "Dive"
 "Bloodstream"
 "Happier"
 "Galway Girl"
 "I See Fire"
 "How Would You Feel (Paean)" 
 "Photograph"
 "Perfect"
 "Nancy Mulligan"
 "Thinking Out Loud"
 "Sing"
Encore
 "Shape of You"
 "You Need Me, I Don't Need You"

Tour dates

Cancelled shows

Notes

See also 
 List of highest-grossing concert tours

References

External links 
 ÷ Tour on Ed Sheeran Official Website

2017 concert tours
2018 concert tours
2019 concert tours
Ed Sheeran concert tours